The AGM-12 Bullpup is a short-range air-to-ground missile developed by Martin Marietta for the US Navy. It is among the earliest precision guided air-to-ground weapons and the first to be mass produced. It first saw operational use in 1959 on the A-4 Skyhawk, but soon found use on the A-6 Intruder, F-100 Super Sabre, F-105 Thunderchief, F-4 Phantom II, F-8 Crusader, and P-3 Orion in both Navy and US Air Force service, as well as NATO allies. In the 1960s it was increasingly supplanted by fully automatic weapons like the AGM-62 Walleye and AGM-65 Maverick.

History

ASM-N-7 Bullpup
Development of Bullpup began in 1953 when Korean War experience demonstrated the almost complete inability for conventional bombing to attack point land targets like bridges. There had been great experimentation during World War II on various guided weapons by many of the belligerents, including some operational use of radio control weapons by Germany and the US with varying degrees of success. These experiments mostly ended in the post-war era, especially as nuclear weapons made accuracy a less interesting problem to solve. This left little research into conventional weapons before Korea started.

A contract tender for a new weapon was released in 1953 calling for a weapon armed with the AN-M57 or AN-M81 bomb and a maximum speed of Mach 2. The contract was won by Martin Marietta in April 1954 and the project was assigned the name ASM-N-7 Bullpup. The initial XASM-N-7 prototypes were powered by the Mark 8 Mod 1 solid propellant rocket motor made by Aerojet-General, which delivered about 38 kN of thrust for 2.5 seconds. The first test launches were carried out in June 1955.

The weapon was guided by the launch aircraft through the manual command to line of sight (MCLOS) method, with the pilot tracking the flight of the missile via two bright flares on the weapon's tail and making corrections using a small joystick in the cockpit. The position of the receiver antenna on the weapon meant that the aircraft had to continue flying in roughly the same direction as the missile in order for the signals to be received from the AN/ARW-73 transmitter, and due to the location of the cockpit on the aircraft, this generally meant the aircraft had to be in a dive toward the target throughout the approach.

Although the weapon did not meet its original requirements exactly, in that it carried only the M81 warhead and reached M1.8, development was otherwise straightforward. The weapon was officially put into service on 25 April 1959 on the A-4 Skyhawks aboard the USS Lexington. This was followed by fittings on the North American FJ-4 Fury and Sikorsky CH-34. Production versions were mostly built by Maxson Electronics.

GAM-79 White Lance, Bullpup A
The US Air Force was interested in the system as early as 1954, and in 1955 began development of their own version, known as White Lance. Desiring higher performance, White Lance was to use a liquid fuel rocket engine, the Thiokol LR-44 which provides approximately 53.9 kN of thrust for 2 seconds. Another change was to move to a newer radio control system, the AN/ARW-77, which allowed off-axis guiding so the aircraft could fly parallel to the target instead of straight at it, greatly increasing visibility and eliminating the need to dive directly at the target.

While they waited for GAM-79, the Air Force also purchased examples of the ASM-N-7, which they put into service under the name GAM-83 on the North American F-100 and Republic F-105. As the development of GAM-79 continued, the Navy also became interested in a liquid fuel engine and had Thiokol build another version, the LR58. These were introduced as the ASM-N-7a Bullpup A in 1960. As this weapon was essentially identical to the planned GAM-79, so that name was dropped and the ASM-N-7a was introduced as the GAM-83A. The Air Force also introduced the GAM-83B, which differed in having a slightly larger diameter to carry the 1.5 kT W45 nuclear warhead.

For training purposes, Martin produced a guidance system that could be fit to surplus High Velocity Aircraft Rockets, which entered service as the TASM-N-7/TGAM-83.

Bullpup B

While development of the original versions was still ongoing, development of a significantly larger version, ASM-N-7b Bullpup B, began. Although the new motor gave the system longer maximum range, the existing systems were already at the limit of the typical pilot's eyesight, and in practice the new model had the same effective range. The first tests were carried out in 1962 and Bullpup B entered service in 1964.

As part of the inter-service effort to align designations of their weapon systems, all Bullpups were renamed AGM-12 in 1963. The original solid-fuel versions became the AGM-12A, which was somewhat confusing given the Navy naming for their liquid-fuel versions. The liquid-fuel versions became AGM-12B, overlapping the ASM-N-7b which became AGM-12C. The Air Force's nuclear GAM-83B became the AGM-12D. The TGAM-83 was renamed ATM-12, lacking a suffix which the new naming rules required.

ATG-12E
The final version of the Bullpup was the Air Force's AGM-12E. This was a AGM-12C with the warhead replaced with an anti-personnel cluster bomb warhead with 800-830 BLU-26/B bomblets. This was produced in small numbers for use in Vietnam.

Operational service
Bullpups were widely used by both the Navy and Air Force during the Vietnam War, with mixed results. In its most famous early use, sixteen Air Force F-105's carrying two AGM-12Bs were part of the group of aircraft that attacked the Thanh Hóa Bridge on 3 April 1965. Because the weapon was manually guided, each aircraft had to line up for attack twice in separate passes. After the attack was completed the bridge was essentially undamaged, and the Bullpups were described as simply "bouncing off" the bridge.

In addition to the lack of destructive power, the requirement to carry out separate passes for each release, and the need to continue guiding the weapon through its flight, led the Air Force to conclude the weapon was inadequate. In the late 1960s they began several development projects to replace the guidance system of the AGM-12C with some sort of fully or semi-automatic guidance. The AGM-79 Blue Eye used a contrast seeker like that in the AGM-65 Maverick; AGM-80 Viper used inertial guidance for airburst operations, and the AGM-83 Bulldog used laser guidance. None of these entered service; other weapons like Maverick and laser guided bombs took over these roles.

Approximately 56,000 Bullpups of all models were produced by the time production ended in 1969, the majority being the A and B models, along with 4,600 AGM-12C, 100 AGM-12D, and 800 AGM-12E. The smaller A/B versions remained in service in the mid-1970s as the newer weapons began to supplant them, with the Navy's last firings during July 1978 when VP-1 patrol aircraft fired three at practice targets. The weapon left Navy service that month. The larger C model remained until the early 1980s.

Production was also undertaken in Norway by Kongsberg Våpenfabrikk in partnership with the UK's de Havilland. While production ramped up, the UK purchased 1,200 from the US and then began deliveries of another 2,500 from Kongsberg. Norway purchased another 1,500 local-built examples, and sold another 2,500 to Turkey under a co-production system. Israel purchased 760 AGM-12Bs and Cs from the US.

Design
The missile was constructed in two separate portions for the nose and tail. The nose contained the guidance receivers which translated instructions into commands for the electro-pneumatic actuators for the four small delta wing control fins arranged around the nose. The tail section held the two tracking flares and larger wings to maintain flight and help prevent the airframe from rolling in flight. The main roll prevention was provided by a gyroscope controlling the front control fins.

The Bullpup used a Manual Command Line Of Sight guidance system with roll-stabilization. In flight, the pilot or weapons operator tracked the Bullpup by watching the flares and used a control joystick to steer it toward the target using radio signals. The goal was to direct the missile so that it remained on the line between the pilot and the target.

After launching the Bullpup, best accuracy was maintained by continuing to fly the same track, so that the pilot could sight down the smoke trail and steer the missile from directly behind as much as possible. Unfortunately, one problem quickly discovered by pilots in Vietnam was that gunners on the ground could simply fire at the smoke trail of the missile's flare and have a fairly good chance of hitting the aircraft that had launched—and was still guiding—the missile. Thus, to try to protect their own aircraft, the pilot would "jig" slightly off of the missile's path and hopefully avoid the anti-aircraft fire.

Operators

Former operators

 Royal Australian Air Force

 Royal Danish Air Force

 Hellenic Air Force

 Israel Defense Forces

 Royal Norwegian Air Force

 Republic of China Air Force

 Turkish Air Force

 Royal Air Force
 Royal Navy

 United States Air Force
 United States Navy

See also

References

External links
 Designation Systems.Net website 
 Federation of American Scientists webpage

Cold War air-to-surface missiles of the United States
AGM-012
Nuclear air-to-surface missiles
Military equipment introduced in the 1950s